Leif Andersson (born 1954) is a Swedish animal geneticist and professor of functional genomics at Uppsala University. In 2014, he won the Wolf Prize in Agriculture alongside Jorge Dubcovsky. He was inducted into the Royal Swedish Academy of Sciences in 2002 and is a foreign member of the National Academy of Sciences. He was elected to the American Philosophical Society in 2017.

Career 

Andersson grew up in Stockholm. After completing his undergraduate degree, he worked at the Swedish University of Agricultural Sciences. He completed his Ph.D. at Uppsala University. In 2012, Andersson and a team of researchers mapped the pig genome. Andersson has also researched animal domestication, the domestic chicken genome, and the genetics of the white horse.

References 

1954 births
Living people
Members of the American Philosophical Society
Wolf Prize in Agriculture laureates
Foreign associates of the National Academy of Sciences
Foreign members of the Chinese Academy of Engineering
Members of the Royal Swedish Academy of Sciences